Polish presidential inauguration is an event marking the beginning of a new term for the President of Poland. According to Article 130 of the current Constitution of Poland (1997) the only condition of taking the office of President of Poland is taking the oath before the  National Assembly. All other events are purely ceremonial.

Background
If the winning candidate holds any other office, he is obliged to renounce the previously held office on the same day the chairman of National Electoral Commission officially presents election certificate to president-elect. Electoral law specifies that the president-elect is to be inaugurated on day of expiry of the outgoing president's term or if the office was vacated before the election, 7 days after the Supreme Court confirmed the election results to be valid.

Highlights of the inauguration

Parliamentary Ceremony
President-elect arrives at the National Assembly, usually accompanied by the First Lady. The Ceremony is presided by the Marshal of the Sejm or in his/her absence, the Marshal of the Senate. The inauguration begins by opening of the session by the presiding officer and singing of the national anthem of Poland (titled Poland Is Not Yet Lost and commonly known as "Dąbrowski's Mazurka").

, the current procedure of the oath is stipulated in the resolution of the National Assembly from December 6, 2000 titled "Regulamin Zgromadzenia Narodowego zwołanego w celu złożenia przysięgi przez nowo wybranego Prezydenta Rzeczypospolitej Polskiej" (M.P. Nr 40, poz. 774).

The president then repeats the following the oath of office after the presiding officer:

All presidents except Aleksander Kwaśniewski finished the oath with optional So help me God.

The outgoing presidential couple, and other guests invited by president-elect, watch the ceremony from the balcony. Wojciech Jaruzelski was not invited to Lech Wałęsa's inauguration.

Further ceremonies and the handover
After taking the oath of office, the president delivers his inaugural address and leaves for the Royal Castle, Warsaw to receive the Grand Cross of the Order of Polonia Restituta and  the Order of the White Eagle. (Andrzej Duda attended a service at St. John's Cathedral before going to the Castle.) After receiving presidential insignia, president arrives at the Presidential Palace where incoming and outgoing presidential couples bid farewell to each other. The president then arrives at Piłsudski Square for a military ceremony confirming his assumption of the office of commander-in-chief of the Polish Armed Forces. If the president is reelected, only the parliamentary ceremony takes place.

Dates
August 6, 2015, Andrzej Duda
During 1939-1990 the office of President-in-Exile was performed by the wartime deputies assigned according to Article 24 of the April Constitution of Poland (1935)
December 11, 1922, Gabriel Narutowicz, first President of Poland

References

Presidential inaugurations
Presidents of Poland
Politics of Poland
Ceremonies in Poland